Lokupathirage Janak Premalal (born May 15, 1959 as ජනක් ප්‍රේමලාල්) [Sinhala]), is an actor in Sri Lankan cinema, stage drama and television. Highly versatile actor dominated in television, he has acted in more than 200 television serials.

Early life
He was born on May 15, 1959 in Karannagoda. His father Sirisena Premalal is a script writer and a teacher at Govinna Senior School worked in 1952. His mother Daya Weerakkody was also a teacher who worked in Govinna Primary School. He first attended to Govinna Primary School and then to Horana Sripali Vidyalaya. Then he went to Vidyarathana College, Horana for education since grade 8. He has one brother who is an army officer.

Premalal completed A/L from commerce stream and selected to Faculty of commerce in University of Sri Jayewardenepura. He completed the degree from Property Administration & Valuation Science. In 1982, he was appointed as a valuation officer at Department of Assessments and Taxation. In 1984, he joined as an economics teacher in his school Vidyarathana College, Horana. He continued to work in the profession for thirty years until his retirement in 2014.

He is married to his longtime partner Gnanothra. The couple has one daughter, Sasikala and one son, Gayanjith. Gayanjith is an IT graduate at University of Moratuwa. Sasikala is a chemistry graduate at University of Peradeniya.

Acting career
While in the school at the age of 18, Premalal started drama career by acting in the stage play Kathawak Athara Hadiyak produced by Ariyapala Pathirajha. In 1976, the play won first place at All Island drama competition as well. His television drama career started with a minor role in serial Hathpana and then with Siw Mansala. His first main role in television came through 1993 serial Sandagiri Pawwa. His maiden cinema acting came through 1993 film Guru Gedara directed by Vijaya Darma Sri with a minor uncredited role.

Selected stage dramas
 Kathawak Athara Hadiyak
 Ambu Samiyo
 Mahagiri Dambaya
 Numba Vitharak Thala Elalui

Selected television serials

 Aadaraneeya Poornima
 Ado 
 Aeya
 Ammai Thaththai
 Ape Adare
 Api Api Wage I
 Api Api Wage II
 Arundathi
 Athma Senehasa
 Bogala Sawundiris
 Bonda Meedum
 Bopath Ella
 Damsari
 Deva Daruwo 
 Dhawala Kadulla 
 Dhawala Yamaya
 Diya Matha Ruwa 
 Doo Kumariyo
 Dumriya Andaraya  
 Eka Iththaka Mal
 Girikula
 Golu Thaththa
 Guru Geethaya 
 Haaratha Hera
 Hathpana
 Hima Kumari
 Hiru Kumari
 Hirusanda Maima 
 Hoduwawa 
 Idora Wassa
 Isisara Isawwa
 Issarahata Yanna
 Isuru Pawura 
 Iththo
 Jeewithaya Lassanai
 Karuwala Gedara
 Katu Imbula 
 Kinduru Kumariya
 Kulawamiya
 Law nam Law
 Mathi Nethi Daa
 Mayarajini
 Mayaratne
 Monaravila 
 Nedeyo
 Nisala Vilthera
 Oba Mageya
 Pawani
 Pembara Maw Sanda
 Piththala Konderuma
 Ran Poruwa 
 Ran Samanalayo
 Ranthili Wewa
 Rathriya
 Ridee Ittankaraya 
 Rupantharaya
 Ruwan Sakmana
 Sadisi Tharanaya 
 Salmal Landa
 Sanda Diya Mankada
 Sandagiri Pawwa
 Sanda Nodutu Sanda
 Sanda Thaniyama
 Sandu Pama
 Sathara Ima Gini 
 Saveena
 Senakeliyay Maya
 Senehasa Kaviyak neela pabalu
 Sidu
 Senuri
 Sikuru Udanaya 
 Siri Dev Bawana
 Siw Mansala
 Sooriya Daruwo
 Subha Prarthana
 Suwanda Padma 
 Swarnapali
 Swayanjatha
 Theth Saha Viyali 
 Thum Path Rela
 Uthuwankande Sura Saradiel
 Veedi Pahan
 Vinivindimi
 Walakulu

Beyond acting
In 1984, he directed his first stage play Abuddassa Kolama, which won many awards at Youth Drama Festival. Then in 1988, he directed the stage play Raja Kapuru and Rajagahe Nadagama in 2000. In 2004, he directed the play Salwala Kelabila. Raja Kapuru was also staged in Japan.

In 1984, Abuddassa Kolama won seven awards at the All Island Drama Competition conducted by the National Youth Services Council. And in 1988, Raja Kapuru won three awards at All Island Drama Competition.

Filmography

Awards and accolades
He won the Best actor award in for the role in television serial Swayanjatha. In 2006, he won two Best Actor awards for the role in Katu Imbula at Raigam Tele'es and Sumathi Awards. Then in 2008, he won the award for the Best Actor for Kaluwara Gedara at SIGNIS awards and Raigam Tele'es.

Raigam Tele'es

|-
||201 ||| Swayanjatha || Best Actor || 
|-
||2006 ||| Katu Imbula || Best Actor || 
|-
||2008 ||| Karuwala Gedara || Best Actor ||

Sumathi Awards

|-
||2006 ||| Katu Imbula || Best Actor || 
|-
||2015 ||| Girikula || Best Actor ||

SIGNIS Awards

|-
||2008 ||| Karuwala Gedara || Best Actor ||

State Drama Festival

|-
||2012 ||| Swayanjatha || Best Actor ||

References

External links
 ටෙලි නාට්‍ය තව වැඩිම උනොත් තව වසර 10 යි
 Interview with Janak

Sinhalese male actors
Living people
Sri Lankan male film actors
1959 births